USS Washington may refer to:

Ships named in honor of George Washington:

  was a schooner acquired in October 1775 and captured by the Royal Navy in December the same year
  was a row galley acquired in January 1776 with an unknown fate after August the same year
  was one of 13 frigates authorized by the Continental Congress, launched in August 1776; and scuttled in November 1777 to prevent capture
  was a galley built and subsequently captured by the Royal Navy in October 1776
  was a ship of the line on active service from 1815 to 1820
 USRC Washington (1833) was a revenue cutter launched in 1833 and sold in June 1837

Ships or boats named in honor of the State of Washington

  was a  armored cruiser, launched in 1905, renamed Seattle in 1916, reclassified as a heavy cruiser in 1920; and scrapped 1946
  was a  launched in 1921 and sunk as a gunnery target in 1924 after her construction was halted in 1922
  was a  launched in 1940, decommissioned in 1947, and scrapped in 1961
  is a 

Others
 , was a revenue cutter named after Peter G. Washington, Assistant Secretary of the Treasury. The ship was launched in 1837 and seized by Confederate Navy in June 1861.
 , was a United States Navy seagoing coal barge during 1917

See also
 
 
 
 

United States Navy ship names